Lovick Pierce "Eddie" McLane (August 9, 1899 – June 22, 1980) was an American football, basketball, and baseball coach at Anniston High School, Samford University (then named Howard College), and Louisiana Tech University. All three schools where McLane coached are nicknamed the Bulldogs. In McLane's final football season at Samford in 1933, his Bulldogs were Dixie Conference champions. McLane died on June 22, 1980 in Ruston, Louisiana.

Head coaching record

College football

References

External links
 

1899 births
1980 deaths
Louisiana Tech Bulldogs and Lady Techsters athletic directors
Louisiana Tech Bulldogs baseball coaches
Louisiana Tech Bulldogs basketball coaches
Louisiana Tech Bulldogs football coaches
Samford Bulldogs baseball coaches
Samford Bulldogs baseball players
Samford Bulldogs men's basketball coaches
Samford Bulldogs football coaches
Samford Bulldogs football players
High school football coaches in Alabama
People from Dale County, Alabama
Players of American football from Alabama
Baseball players from Alabama
Basketball coaches from Alabama